Samuktala  (also spelled Samuktola, Shamuktala) is a census town and a gram panchayat in the Alipurduar II CD block in the Alipurduar subdivision of the Alipurduar district  in the state of West Bengal, India.

Geography

Location

Area overview
Alipurduar district is covered by two maps. It is an extensive area in the eastern end of the Dooars in West Bengal. It is undulating country, largely forested, with numerous rivers flowing down from the outer ranges of the Himalayas in Bhutan. It is a predominantly rural area with 79.38% of the population living in the rural areas. The district has 1 municipal town and 20 census towns and that means that 20.62% of the population lives in the urban areas. The scheduled castes and scheduled tribes, taken together, form more than half the population in all the six community development blocks in the district. There is a high concentration of tribal people (scheduled tribes) in the three northern blocks of the district.

Note: The map alongside presents some of the notable locations in the subdivision. All places marked in the map are linked in the larger full screen map.

Civic administration

Police station
There is a police station at Samuktala. It has jurisdiction over Alipurduar II CD block.

Demographics
According to the 2011 Census of India, Samuktola had a total population of 8,132 of which 4,169 (51%) were males and 3,963 (49%) were females. There were 876 persons in the age range of 0 to 6 years. The total number of literate people in Samuktola was 5,971 (82.29% of the population over 6 years).

Infrastructure
According to the District Census Handbook 2011, Jalpaiguri, Samuktola covered an area of 3.6242 km2. Among the civic amenities, the protected water supply involved hand pumps. It had 745 domestic electric connections. Among the medical facilities it had 5 medicine shops. Among the educational facilities it had 4 primary schools, 3 middle schools, 3 secondary schools, 3 senior secondary schools, the nearest general degree college at Alipurduar 2 km away. It had the offices of 1 nationalised bank, 1 cooperative bank.

Education
Samuktala Sidhu Kanhu College was established in 2010. Affiliated with the University of North Bengal it offers a honours course in Bengali and a general course in arts.

Healthcare
There is a  primary health centre with 10 beds at Samuktala.

References

Cities and towns in Alipurduar district